Otitinae is the name of a subfamily of flies in the family Ulidiidae. It was formerly the Otitidae. Like the Ulidiinae, most species are herbivorous or saprophagous. Most species share with the Tephritidae an unusual elongated projection of the anal cell in the wing, but can be differentiated by the smoothly curving subcostal vein. Most are dull gray to shiny brown or black flies with vein R1 setulose or, in a few cases, bare.

Tribes and genera
Tribe Cephaliini
Acrostictella Hendel, 1914
Cephalia Meigen, 1826
Delphinia Robineau-Desvoidy, 1830
Myiomyrmica Steyskal, 1961
Myrmecothea Hendel, 1910
Proteseia Korneyev & Hernandes, 1998
Pterotaenia Rondani, 1868
Tritoxa Loew, 1873
Tribe Myennidini
Acatochaeta Enderlein, 1921
Arborotites Barraclough, 2000
Callopistromyia Hendel, 1907
Dyscrasis Aldrich, 1932
Myennis Robineau-Desvoidy, 1830
Namibotites Barraclough, 2000
Neodyscrasis Kameneva & Korneyev, 2006
Oedopa Loew, 1868
Paroedopa Coquillett, 1900
Pseudodyscrasis Hernández-Ortiz, 1988
Pseudotephritina Malloch, 1931
Pseudotephritis Johnson, 1902
Stictoedopa Brèthes, 1926
Stictomyia Bigot, 1885
Ulidiotites Steyskal, 1961
Tribe Otitini
Ceroxys Macquart, 1835
Dorycera Meigen, 1830
Herina Robineau-Desvoidy, 1830
Hiatus Cresson, 1906
Melieria Robineau-Desvoidy, 1830
Otites Latreille, 1804
Tetanops Fallén, 1820
Ulidiopsis  Hennig, 1941
Otitinae incertae sedis
Curranops Harriot, 1942
Diacrita Gerstäcker, 1860
Haigia Steyskal, 1961
Idana Loew, 1873
Psaeropterella Hendel, 1914
Pseudomelieria Brèthes, 1921
Tetropismenus Loew, 1876
Tujunga Steyskal, 1961

References

 
Ulidiidae
Brachycera subfamilies
Taxa named by John Merton Aldrich